Nayagarh district is one of the 30 districts of Odisha state in eastern India. It was created in 1st April 1993 when the erstwhile Puri District was split into three distinct districts, namely Khordha, Nayagarh and Puri.

The district is bordered by Khordha district to the south and east, Cuttack district to the east and north, Angul district to the north, Boudh district to the northwest, Kandhamal district to the west and Ganjam district to the southwest.

Blocks
 Bhapur
 Daspalla
 Gania
 Khandapada
 Nayagarh
 Nuagan
 Odagaon
 Ranapur

Demographics

According to the 2011 census, Nayagarh district has a population of 962,789, roughly equal to the nation of Fiji or the US state of Montana. This gives it a ranking of 453rd in India (out of a total of 640). Its population growth rate over the decade 2001-2011 was  11.3%. Nayagarh has a sex ratio of  916 females for every 1000 males, and a literacy rate of 79.17%. Scheduled Castes and Scheduled Tribes make up 14.17% and 6.10% of the population respectively.

Language

Odia is the predominant language, spoken by 99.09% of the population. Kui is spoken by a small minority (0.60%).

See also
 Nayagarh State – Princely state existed in the Nayagarh district, Odisha, India.

References

External links

 

 
1995 establishments in Orissa
Districts of Odisha